Jonesville Mine Airport  is a privately owned public-use airport located two nautical miles (4 km) northwest of the central business district of Sutton, in the Matanuska-Susitna Borough of the U.S. state of Alaska.

Satellite imagery displays the airport as abandoned.

Facilities
Jonesville Mine Airport has one runway designated 3/21 with a gravel surface measuring 1,450 by 90 feet (442 x 27 m).

References

External links
 FAA Alaska airport diagram (GIF)
 Topographic map from USGS The National Map

Defunct airports in Alaska
Airports in Matanuska-Susitna Borough, Alaska
Defunct privately owned airports